There are two places in New Zealand named Vogeltown. Both are named after Julius Vogel, a 19th-century prime minister.

Vogeltown, Wellington is a suburb of Wellington
Vogeltown, Taranaki is a suburb of New Plymouth